The 2005 FIBA Europe Under-18 Championship Division B was an international basketball  competition held in Slovakia in 2005.

Final ranking
1.  Ukraine

2.  Iceland

3.  Hungary

4.  Finland

5.  Portugal

6.  Netherlands

7.  Austria

8.  Bosnia and Herzegovina

9.  Sweden

10.  Estonia

11.  Luxembourg

12.  Macedonia

13.  Slovakia

14.  England

15.  Czech Republic

16.  Ireland

17.  Romania

Awards

External links
FIBA Archive

FIBA U18 European Championship Division B
2005–06 in European basketball
2005–06 in Slovak basketball
International youth basketball competitions hosted by Slovakia